Echinoplaca is a genus of lichens in the family Gomphillaceae.

Species
E. amapensis
E. atrofusca
E. atromuralis
E. bispora
E. campanulata
E. diffluens
E. epiphylla
E. epiphylloides
E. furcata
E. fusconitida
E. handelii
E. hispida
E. intercedens
E. leucomuralis
E. leucotrichoides
E. lucernifera
E. marginata
E. melanotrix
E. pachyparaphysata
E. pellicula
E. pernambucensis
E. schizidiifera
E. similis
E. tetrapla
E. triseptata
E. verrucifera
E. wilsoniorum

References

Ostropales
Lichen genera
Ostropales genera
Taxa named by Antoine Laurent Apollinaire Fée
Taxa described in 1825